The 2021–22 Minnesota Wild season was the 22nd season for the National Hockey League franchise that was established on June 25, 1997. The Wild clinched a playoff spot after a 5–4 overtime win against the San Jose Sharks, which would be their ninth postseason appearance in the last 10 seasons. Despite setting franchise records in wins (53), and points (113), the Wild were upset in the first round by the St. Louis Blues, losing in six games.

Standings

Divisional standings

Conference standings

Schedule and results

Regular season
The regular season schedule was released on July 22, 2021, with only about a handful of games scheduled in February because NHL players are planning to participate in the 2022 Winter Olympics.

Playoffs

Player statistics
As of May 13, 2022

Skaters

Goaltenders

†Denotes player spent time with another team before joining the Wild. Stats reflect time with the Wild only.
‡Denotes player was traded mid-season. Stats reflect time with the Wild only.
Bold/italics denotes franchise record.

Transactions
The Wild have been involved in the following transactions during the 2021–22 season.

Trades

Notes:
 Minnesota will receive a 7th-round pick in 2022 if Mennell plays 30 games for Toronto in 2021–22; otherwise no pick will be exchanged.
 Chicago will receive Minnesota's 1st-round pick in 2022 if they reach the 2022 Western Conference Final and Fleury has at least four wins in the first two rounds; otherwise they will receive a 2nd-round pick.

Players acquired

Players lost

Signings

Draft picks

Below are the Minnesota Wild's selections at the 2021 NHL Entry Draft, which were held on July 23 to 24, 2021. It was held virtually via Video conference call from the NHL Network studio in Secaucus, New Jersey.

References

Minnesota Wild seasons
Wild
2021 in sports in Minnesota
2022 in sports in Minnesota